William Bradford Ross (December 4, 1873 – October 2, 1924) was an American politician who served as the 12th governor of Wyoming as a Democrat.

Life

William Bradford Ross was born in Dover, Tennessee on December 4, 1873 to Ambrose B. Ross and Sue Gray and later attended the Peabody Normal School. He met Nellie Davis Tayloe while she was visiting her relatives in Dover and after moving to Cheyenne, Wyoming in 1901 they married on September 11, 1902 in Omaha, Nebraska and later had three children (twins James Ambrose and George Tayloe, Alfred Duff).

From 1906 to 1907 he served as Laramie County's prosecuting attorney and in 1910 he unsuccessfully ran for Wyoming's at-large congressional seat. In 1918 he mounted a primary campaign against incumbent Governor Frank L. Houx, but was defeated. From 1910 to 1922, Ross served on the Wyoming Board of Law Examiners, including terms as the board's president.

Governor

During the 1922 gubernatorial election the Republican Party was divided due to a contentious primary between Robert D. Carey and John W. Hay where Hay won by only 443 votes and by appealing to Carey's voters through his strong prohibition stances allowed him to narrowly defeat Hay by 723 votes. In June 1924 he served as one of Wyoming's delegates to the Democratic National Convention.

Death

On September 23, 1924 he gave a speech in favor of a severance tax constitutional amendment in Laramie and while being driven home became sick. It was discovered that he was suffering from phlebitis, but died on October 2, 1924 after suffering complications following an appendectomy that happened on September 25. Secretary of State Frank Lucas served as acting governor until a special election was held where Ross's wife, Nellie Tayloe Ross, won and became the first female governor in the United States.

Electoral history

References

1873 births
1924 deaths
American Episcopalians
American Freemasons
Democratic Party governors of Wyoming
Governors of Wyoming
Tennessee Democrats
People from Dover, Tennessee
Politicians from Cheyenne, Wyoming
Wyoming Democrats
Wyoming lawyers
19th-century American lawyers